Parkview Apartments may refer to:

in the United States
 Parkview Apartments (Pine Bluff, Arkansas), listed on the NRHP
 Parkview Apartments (Cleveland), Ohio
 Parkview Apartments (Portland, Oregon), listed on the NRHP in Oregon